Shenzhou 5 (see § Etymology) was the first human spaceflight mission of the Chinese space program, launched on 15 October 2003. The Shenzhou spacecraft was launched on a Long March 2F launch vehicle. There had been four previous flights of uncrewed Shenzhou missions since 1999. China became the third country in the world to have independent human spaceflight capability after the Soviet Union (later, Russia) and the United States.

Crew

Mission parameters 
 Mass: 7,840 kg
 Perigee: 332 km
 Apogee: 336 km
 Inclination: 42.4°
 Period: 91.2 minutes
 NSSDC ID: 2003-045A

Mission highlights

Shenzhou 5 was launched at 09:00 (UTC +8) from Jiuquan Satellite Launch Center, a launch base in the Gobi Desert in Gansu Province, entering orbit 343 km above Earth at 09:10 (UTC +8) with astronaut Yang Liwei (杨利伟), a 38 year-old Lieutenant Colonel in the People's Liberation Army and former fighter pilot.  The launch made China the third country to independently launch a person into space, after the Soviet Union and the United States. The launch of the Shenzhou was the result of a crewed space program which began in 1992.

Neither the launch nor the reentry was televised live, but the time of both launch and reentry had been widely announced beforehand, and news appeared on Chinese Central Television within minutes after both events.

Orbital spaceflight

The Shenzhou spacecraft made 14 orbits and landed 21 hours after launch. It re-entered Earth's atmosphere at 06:04 (UTC +8) on October 16, 2003 (22:04 UTC 15 Oct 2003), its parachute opened normally and the astronaut said he was feeling fine. The landing happened at 06:28 (UTC +8), just 4.8 kilometers from the planned landing site in Inner Mongolia, according to the government. The orbital module of the spacecraft stayed in orbit; it continued with automated experiments until March 16, 2004, and decayed on May 30.

Premier Wen Jiabao congratulated the country's first person in space after his safe return to Earth. Yáng emerged from the capsule about 15 minutes later and waved to members of the recovery team.

The control center in Beijing later declared China's first crewed spacecraft mission to be successful after Yang Liwei emerged from his capsule.

Yáng's experience in space
During the flight Yáng wore diapers. When questioned about his experience aboard Shenzhou 5 he stated "Better not to piss in diaper...Baby doesn't like it, neither does an adult."

In addition, Yang reported abnormal vibrations that appeared 120 seconds after launch (pogo oscillation), which he described as "very uncomfortable." As a consequence, corrective measures were taken to the design of the following CZ-2F carrier rocket for the Shenzhou 6 flight.

Politics 
The launch was widely heralded in the official Chinese state media with newspapers devoting far more space to the launch than any recent event. While the Chinese media portrayed the launch as a triumph for Chinese science and technology and a milestone for Chinese nationalism, it has also been pointed out in both Chinese and Western media that Yang Liwei showed the flag of the United Nations in addition to the flag of the People's Republic of China. The state media also reported that crop seeds from Taiwan were brought aboard the spacecraft. Both the Chief Executive's of Hong Kong and Macau sent letters congratulating all the people involved in the mission and also the Central Government in addition to thanking the motherland

General Secretary and President Hu Jintao, in an official celebration at the Great Hall of the People, hailed China's success in launching its first crewed spacecraft into orbit, describing it as "an honor for our great motherland, an indicator for the initial victory of the country's first crewed space flight and for an historic step taken by the Chinese people in their endeavor to surmount the peak of the world's science and technology."

Hu added, "the Party and the people will never forget those who have set up this outstanding merit in the space industry for the motherland, the people and the nation." He also expressed congratulations and respect to specialists and people who have contributed to China's space mission development on behalf of the CPC Central Committee, the State Council and the Central Military Commission (CMC).

The launch was met with praise from around the world. Prime Minister of Japan Junichiro Koizumi called the launch "a great feat".  United States President George W. Bush congratulated Chinese President Hu and wished China continued success. A U.S. State Department spokesman said that the United States wished to "applaud China's success in becoming only the third country to launch people into space". NASA Administrator Sean O'Keefe called Shenzhou 5 an "important achievement in human exploration" and wished China "a continued safe human space flight program."

The spacecraft has since featured prominently in festivities and celebrations not only in China but also in foreign countries, such as official North Korean commemorative stamps showing the first Chinese crewed spacecraft alongside the DPRK's first satellite Kwangmyŏngsŏng-1.

Gallery

See also 

 Chinese space program
 Tiangong program
 Shenzhou spacecraft
 Long March rocket
 Jiuquan Satellite Launch Center

References

External links 

 http://space.com/missionlaunches/
 https://web.archive.org/web/20030921102715/http://www.astronautix.com/articles/couzhou5.htm
 Spacefacts data about Shenzhou 5

Shenzhou 05
Shenzhou 05
Spacecraft launched in 2003
2003 in China